Albiano d'Ivrea (Piedmontese: Albian) is a comune (municipality) in the Metropolitan City of Turin in the Italian region Piedmont, located about  northeast of Turin.

Albiano d'Ivrea borders the following municipalities: Bollengo, Ivrea, Palazzo Canavese, Piverone, Azeglio, Caravino, and Vestignè. The economy is mostly based on cereals and forage production.

The Baroque church of San Martino Vescovo di Tours is located in the city.

References

Cities and towns in Piedmont